Danny Pang is the name of:
Danny Pang (financier) (1966–2009), Taiwanese-American hedge fund manager
Danny Pang Phat (born 1965), film editor, who with his identical twin brother, film director Oxide, are known as the Pang Brothers